James Darcy (November 12, 1834 – September 1, 1863) was an American politician from New York.

Life 
Darcy was born on November 12, 1834, in Buffalo, New York, the son of Daniel Darcy and Eliza Devenport. His father Daniel was an Irish immigrant and prominent Buffalo political figure. His brother Charles was the Buffalo Chief of Police, and his other brother Daniel Jr. was Deputy Sheriff of Erie County.

In 1851, Darcy moved to Brooklyn, where he worked as a house-carpenter. In 1859, he was elected to the New York State Assembly as a Democrat, representing the Kings County 4th District. He served in the Assembly in 1860, 1861, 1862, and 1863.

Darcy died at home on September 1, 1863.

References

External links 
The Political Graveyard

1834 births
1863 deaths
American people of Irish descent
People from Buffalo, New York
Politicians from Brooklyn
American carpenters
19th-century American politicians
Democratic Party members of the New York State Assembly